The Hockey East Goaltending Champion is an annual award given out at the conclusion of the Hockey East regular season, typically to the goaltender who held the lowest Goals Against Average (GAA) in conference games during the regular season.

The Goaltending Champion was first awarded in 1985 and every year thereafter.

The current record for lowest GAA against conference opponents in a season is held by Jimmy Howard of Maine with a 1.15 Goals Against Average, set during the 2003–04 season.

Seven players have won the award multiple times, with Scott King winning three times. The others, Derek Heriofsky, Michel Larocque, Ty Conklin, Matti Kaltainen, Cayden Primeau and Devon Levi won twice. King, Larocque, Primeau and Levi managed to win the award in consecutive years.

In recent years, the title has occasionally been awarded based on overall merit rather than based on statistics. This has occurred three times, the first in 2016–17 to Collin Delia of Merrimack who held the highest save percentage in conference games (.928%) rather than lowest GAA. Similarly, it was awarded to Jeremy Swayman of Maine in 2019–20 for his conference-leading .934% save percentage. In 2020-21, Spencer Knight of Boston College was awarded the title with a .937% mark, which was tied for the top save percentage in conference games with Filip Lindberg of Massachusetts. However, Knight played nearly double the minutes and had the highest winning percentage in conference games in the league.

Award winners

Winners by school

See also
Hockey East Awards

References

General

Specific

External links
Hockey East Awards (Incomplete)

College ice hockey trophies and awards in the United States
College ice hockey goaltender awards in the United States